The Men's ski halfpipe competition at the FIS Freestyle Ski and Snowboarding World Championships 2023 was held on 1 and 4 March 2023.

Qualification
The qualification was started on 1 March at 12:15. The best ten skiers qualified for the final.

Final
The final was started on 4 March at 10:00.

References

Men's ski halfpipe